Brook Wellington Brasier (1 February 1879 – 30 August 1940) was an Irish politician. 

Hw was born 1 February 1879 in Sunday's Well, Cork, the second son of Brooke Brasier and his wife Clarine Bennett (née Massey). The family later resided at Carrigaline, County Cork. In August 1898 he married Lady Charlotte Moore, youngest daughter of Charles William Moore, 5th Earl Mount Cashell. Lady Charlotte was his elder by twenty-six years; they had no children. It was not till after his wife's death in August 1913, that he became involved in public life.

Brasier stood unsuccessfully for election as a Farmers' Party candidate for the Cork East constituency at the June 1927 and September 1927 general elections. He was first elected to Dáil Éireann as an independent Teachta Dála (TD) for the Cork East constituency at the 1932 general election. He lost his seat at the 1933 general election. He was elected as a Fine Gael TD for the Cork South-East constituency at the 1937 general election. He died in 1940 during the 10th Dáil but no by-election was held to fill his seat.

References

1879 births
1940 deaths
Farmers' Party (Ireland) politicians
Independent TDs
Fine Gael TDs
Members of the 7th Dáil
Members of the 9th Dáil
Members of the 10th Dáil
Politicians from County Cork